Prairieville is an unincorporated community in Hale County, Alabama, United States.

Geography

Landmarks
The town is the location of the 1853 Carpenter Gothic style St. Andrew's Episcopal Church, on the National Register of Historic Places and a National Historic Landmark.

Prairieville also has three Plantation houses on the National Register of Historic Places:
Battersea,
Bermuda Hill
Hawthorne.

See also
National Register of Historic Places listings in Hale County, Alabama

References

Unincorporated communities in Hale County, Alabama
Unincorporated communities in Alabama